Heineman is a surname. Notable people with the surname include:

 Benjamin W. Heineman (1914–2012), American railroad executive
 Benjamin W. Heineman, Jr. (born 1944), American journalist, lawyer and business executive
 Dannie Heineman (1872–1962), Belgian-American engineer and businessman
 Dannie Heineman Prize for Astrophysics
 Dannie Heineman Prize for Mathematical Physics
 Dave Heineman (born 1948), American politician and 39th governor of Nebraska
 Fred Heineman (1929–2010), American politician from North Carolina
 Laurie Heineman (born 1948), American actress and teacher
 Rebecca Heineman (born 1963), American video game programmer
 Scott Heineman (born 1992), American professional baseball player
 Tyler Heineman (born 1991), American professional baseball player

See also
 Heinemann (disambiguation)
 Jamie Hyneman